In probability theory, Isserlis' theorem or Wick's probability theorem is a formula that allows one to compute higher-order moments of the multivariate normal distribution in terms of its covariance matrix.  It is named after Leon Isserlis.

Other applications include the analysis of portfolio returns, quantum field theory and generation of colored noise.

Statement

In his original paper, Leon Isserlis proves this theorem by mathematical induction, generalizing the formula for the   order moments, which takes the appearance

Odd case 
Under this hypothesis, Isserlis' theorem implies that

Even case 
If  is even, there exist  (see double factorial) pair partitions of : this yields  terms in the sum. For example, for  order moments (i.e.  random variables) there are three terms. For -order moments there are  terms, and for -order moments there are  terms.

Proof 
Let  be the covariance matrix, so that we have the zero-mean multivariate normal random vector  .

Using quadratic factorization , we get 

.

If  is odd, this is zero. So let , then we need only find the coefficient of term  in the polynomial .

Expand the polynomial and count, we obtain the formula.

Generalizations

Gaussian integration by parts 
An equivalent formulation of the Wick's probability formula is the Gaussian integration by parts. If  is a zero-mean multivariate normal random vector, then

Among other things, this formulation is important in Liouville Conformal Field Theory to obtain conformal Ward's identities, BPZ equations and to prove the Fyodorov-Bouchaud formula.

Non-Gaussian random variables 
For non-Gaussian random variables, the moment-cumulants formula replaces the Wick's probability formula.

See also
 Wick's theorem
Cumulants 
Normal distribution

References

Further reading
 

Moment (mathematics)
Normal distribution
Probability theorems